A YouTube poop (YTP) is a type of video mashup or edit created by remixing/editing pre-existing media sources often carrying subcultural significance into a new video for humorous, satirical, obscene, absurd, and profane—as well as annoying, confusing, or dramatic
purposes. YouTube poops are traditionally uploaded to the video sharing website YouTube, hence the name.

History
The video regarded as the first YouTube poop was uploaded on the website SheezyArt as opposed to YouTube on December 22, 2004: "The Adventures of Super Mario Bros. 3 REMIXED!!!", or what is now known as "I'D SAY HE'S HOT ON OUR TAIL" by YouTube user SuperYoshi. It was created with Windows Movie Maker and uses clips of episodes from the 1990 animated television series The Adventures of Super Mario Bros. 3 reruns from the Pax network (now known as Ion Television), which has been regarded as kitsch by fans of the Mario franchise, as a primary source. It exhibits stylistic and aesthetical staples of YouTube poop, including repetition of clips for comedic effect (the video name is a particularly campy pun spoken by Luigi that is repeated throughout the video), and critically disregarded media as a video source. Between 2005 and 2006, cutscenes from games released by Russian-American developer Animation Magic (most notably the Philips CD-i games Hotel Mario, Link: The Faces of Evil, and Zelda: The Wand of Gamelon along with the DOS game I.M. Meen) as well as the animated series Adventures of Sonic the Hedgehog and Super Mario World became incredibly common sources in YTPs, as they had been ironically acclaimed for deviating from the quality expected of their respective franchises.

Techniques
Media sources of YouTube poops include television shows, movies, anime, cartoons, commercials, video games, music videos, live performances, historical footages and other videos obtained from YouTube or elsewhere. A typical YouTube poop uses visual and auditory effects to alter the underlying work, as well as rearrangement of individual clips. The most common of such rearrangement being "sentence-mixing", a form of editing in which dialogue is rearranged or chopped up to form new, often humorous dialogue—drawing humour from the unexpected changes to usually well-known source dialogue. Some of these videos may involve completely or partially repurposing sources to create or convey an often self-aware story, while others follow a non-linear narrative, and some may contain no storyline at all, instead regarded among the lines of surreal humour and artistic experimentation. To this degree, a YouTube poop may even consist solely of an existing video, sometimes modified, repeated in a slowed or remixed loop. In many cases, YouTube poops utilize a bizarre sequence of elements which may entertain, confuse, or irritate, depending on the viewer. Associate professor of cultural anthropology at Kansas State University, Michael Wesch, has defined YouTube poops as "absurdist remixes that ape and mock the lowest technical and aesthetic standards of remix culture to comment on remix culture itself".

YTP can often be derivative in the sense that the work of one artist (or, within the community, pooper) is sometimes used as the underlying work for another video; this can be recirculated and lead to the creation of "YTP tennis" videos, named for how they exist in rounds where the original video accumulates edits and alterations. Lawrence Lessig, Professor of Law at Harvard Law School, compared this aspect to a form of call and response, here seen as being prominent within remix culture.

Copyright and fair use
Since YouTube poop relies heavily on audiovisual material protected under copyright law, and the manner in which these sources are depicted is perceived by its owners as detracting from the ways in which consumers are apparently intended to access them, YTPs are known for being removed from YouTube following DMCA complaints. Political scientist and author Trajce Cvetkovski noted in 2013 that, despite Viacom filing a copyright infringement lawsuit against YouTube in 2007 explicitly concerning YouTube poops, in particular "The Sky Had a Weegee" by Hurricoaster, which features scenes from the animated series SpongeBob SquarePants (in particular, the episode "Shanghaied") and Weegee (a satiric caricature based on Nintendo's Luigi as he appears in the DOS version of Mario Is Missing), it and many others have remained on YouTube.

Copyright law in the United Kingdom allows people to use copyrighted material for the purposes of parody, pastiche, and caricature without being seen as infringing on the copyright of the material. Copyright owners are only able to sue the parodist if the work is perceived as communicating hateful or discriminative messages, and modifying the intended purpose of the copyright owner's material. If the case is then taken to court, judges are advised in jurisdictional terms to decide whether the video meets these criteria.

Individual responses

Besides copyright owners, entertainers and public figures whose likeness appears in YouTube poops have been known to make efforts to take YouTube poopers' videos down, because mature and defamatory content is prevalent in them, and if, for example, they have a large audience of children watching said videos, they can create the assumption that these videos are primarily the work of these entertainers. 

Children's poet Michael Rosen (who claims to have "become a cult" among YouTube poopers) initially attempted to take down videos where his poetry readings are modified, but after frank discussions with their creators, he decided to allow the videos to stay online; he compared the videos to obscene photo collages he had created in his youth. In 2012, Rosen issued a warning on his website, saying, "Quite a few people have fun taking my videos and making new versions of them, known as 'YouTube Poops'. Many of these are not suitable for young children. I am not responsible for either the words or pictures of these." Circa 2015, Rosen put a similar warning on his YouTube channel's "about" page. In 2019, Rosen claimed there were "about 4,000 YTPs" of Rosen performing his poems and stories. He stated, "Some are very funny...I'm fond of the funny ones. I have tried to get the racist, antisemitic ones taken down." In 2022, Rosen has attested that, as a 76 year old, it's "amazing to be a meme," and he gets "stopped in the street" by 17 to 19 year olds who request to film him reciting quotes from YouTube Poops.

See also
 Anime music video
 Animutation
 Cult Toons
 Daffy Duck in Hollywood, a 1938 Merrie Melodies short with similarities to YouTube poop
 Downfall (2004 film) § Parodies
 Hotel Mario
 Link: The Faces of Evil and Zelda: The Wand of Gamelon
 Netdisaster
 Remix album - an album with remixes, first used in Harry Nilsson's album Aerial Pandemonium Ballet
 Remix culture - the general culture surrounding modifying existing media into new and original artwork and others
 Schichlegruber - Doing the Lambeth Walk, a 1942 British propaganda short with similarities to YouTube poop
 Vidding
 Weird SoundCloud
 YTMND

References

External links

 

YouTube
Internet slang
2000s neologisms
Computer-related introductions in 2004
2004 introductions
Internet memes introduced in 2004
2004 neologisms
Unofficial adaptations
Fan labor
Internet humor
Off-color humor
Surreal comedy
Parodies
Internet memes